"Oh What a Night" is a 2011 song by the Guano Apes and the first single from their fourth album, Bel Air. It was their first single released in seven years, following Break the Line in 2004. Oh What a Night was released on 18 March 2011 and peaked at No. 37 in Germany. AllMusic gave the song 3½ out of 5 stars. A music video was released on YouTube on 7 March 2011 and reached over 1 million views by 6 July. The video features the band playing in the city of Dubai as a solar eclipse occurs.

Charts

References

2011 songs
Guano Apes songs
Columbia Records singles